"Think" is a song written by Peggy Whittington and performed by Brenda Lee.  The song reached #4 on the adult contemporary chart, #25 on the Billboard Hot 100, and #26 on the UK in 1964.  It also reached #62 in Australia. The song is featured on her 1965 album, Too Many Rivers.

The single's B-side, "The Waiting Game", reached #62 in Australia and #101 on the Billboard chart.

References

1964 songs
1964 singles
Brenda Lee songs
Decca Records singles